Rozzano Dosado Briguez is a Filipino general who formerly served as the Commanding General of the Philippine Air Force. He is a graduate of the Philippine Military Academy "Sinagtala" Class of 1986, and graduated as Top 2 of his class. He was also a commander of the AFP Western Command, and formulated the new command framework: "Padayon PAF: Perform, Reform, Transform", a framework of his leadership philosophy in the Philippine Air Force.

After his retirement from the Philippine Air Force, President Rodrigo Duterte named him the new CEO of the Philippine National Oil Company Exploration Corporation.

Early life and education
Briguez was born in Cebu City on January 17, 1964. His family resides at Sogod, 61 kilometers north of Cebu City. He was a graduate from the Colegio de San Jose-Recoletos, Cebu City, and entered the Philippine Military Academy in 1982 and graduated in 1986. He was the class president and the class baron of Sinagtala Class of 1986 and graduated top 2 of his class. He underwent Military Pilot Training (MPT) (now Air Education, Training and Doctrine Command or AETDC) at the Philippine Air Force School in Basilio Fernando Air Base in Lipa, Batangas. He also took the Aviation Officer Advance Course at the United States Army Aviation Center of Excellence at Fort Rucker, Alabama, the General Staff Course, at the then AFP Command and General Staff Course (now AFP Education, Training, and Doctrine Command or AFPETDCOM), where he graduated as Top 2 of his class. He also holds a Master’s Degrees in Business Management in the Asian Institute of Management, Project Management in University of New South Wales, and in Strategic Studies in the Air University (United States Air Force) in Alabama.

Military career
After undergoing military pilot training at the Philippine Air Force School after completing the training course in 1988, he returned to the Air Force School and joined as a trainer pilot, flying the Cessna T-41D Mescaleros, the SIAI-Marchetti SF.260s and the SIAI-Marchetti AS-211s. He also served at the 220th Airlift Wing, piloting the Air Force's airlift planes, such as the Lockheed C-130 Hercules and the GAF Nomad, in various parts of the country, from troop deployments in Mindanao to disaster response and rehabilitation.

He also held various positions in the PAF, the AFP and the PMA; such as the Commander of Tactical Operations Group 11 of the Tactical Operations Command, based in Davao; Acting Assistant Chief of Air Staff for Plans and Programs, A-5, and as Executive Officer, OA-5. He also served as the Assistant Chief of Air Staff for Education and Training, A-8; Assistant Chief of Air Staff for Operations, A-3; and as Deputy Commander of the 250th Presidential Airlift Wing. 

He was named as the Commandant of Cadets at the Philippine Military Academy, and served as the Chief of Air Staff and the Vice Commander of the Philippine Air Force. He was named the commander of the AFP Western Command on November 20, 2017, where he served as the commander of all AFP units at the West Philippine Sea, and monitors the presence of the Chinese and other neighboring ships within the country's exclusive economic zone (EEZ), before being named as the Commanding General of the Philippine Air Force on December 05, 2018. 

As the Chief of the Philippine Air Force, he crafted the "Padayon PAF: Perform, Reform, Transform", which serves as a framework of his leadership philosophy during his tenure in the Philippine Air Force. He also spearheaded the air force's modernization programs, such as the acquisition of the Multirole Fighter Acquisition Project (which selected the Lockheed Martin F-16C/D Block 70 Viper over the Saab JAS 39 Gripen C/D MS20 on 2019), the awarding notice of the Mitsubishi Electric J/FPS-3ME and the Mitsubishi Electric J/TPS-P14ME radar systems, the SPYDER air-defense system, 1 new EADS CASA C-295 transport aircraft, 1 additional Lockheed C-130B Hercules transport aircraft, 1 new Gulfstream G280 VIP Aircraft (originally intended as a command and control aircraft), 16 new PZL Mielec S70-i combat utility helicopters, and 6 new Embraer A29B Super Tucano attack aircraft. During his term, plans were also laid out to acquire 6 additional NC-212i Aviocar light transport aircraft.  He also led air force operations during the 2020 Taal Volcano Eruption.

He retired from military service on  January 16, 2020 and currently serves as a member at the 1st Air Wing Reserve under the Philippine Air Force Reserve Command.

Awards
Left Side:

Right Side:

Badges and Other Awards:
  Combat Commander's Badge (Philippines)
  AFP Parachutist Badge
 Honorary Airborne Wings - From The Royal Thai Army
 Command Pilot Rating Badge
 Special Leadership Award
 Human Rights Badge
 Secretary of National Defense Saber
 Commanding General, Philippine Air Force Award
 Zobel Scholarship Award

Personal life
He is married to Elis David-Briguez and they have 2 sons.

References

Living people
Filipino military leaders
Philippine Air Force generals
1964 births